The Port of Szczecin (in Polish generally Port Szczecin) is a Polish seaport and deep water harbour in Szczecin, Poland. It is located at the Oder and Regalica rivers in the Lower Oder Valley, off the Szczecin Lagoon. In the past, the port included the now defunct Szczecin Shipyard. A free trade zone has been designated within the port area.

In 2006, cargo traffic in the seaport equaled 9,965,000 tons, comprising 16.5% of all cargo traffic in Polish seaports.
In 2007, the port was entered by 2895 ships with gross tonnage of more than 100.

The Ports of Szczecin and Świnoujście are managed by a single authority, creating one of the largest port complexes at the Baltic Sea.

History

By the Treaty of Versailles the navigation on the Oder became subject to international agreements, and following its articles 363 and 364 Czechoslovakia was entitled to lease in Stettin (now Szczecin) its own harbour bassin, then called Tschechoslowakische Zone im Hafen Stettin (German: the Czechoslovak Zone in the Port of Stettin).

The contract of lease between Czechoslovakia and Germany, and supervised by the United Kingdom, was signed on February 16, 1929, and would end in 2028, however, after 1945 Czechoslovakia did not regain this legal position, de facto abolished in 1938/1939. A similar lease is still in effect for the Moldauhafen port in Hamburg until 2028.

References

External links 

 Szczecin and Świnoujscie Seaports Authority Website (English)

Szczecin
Transport in Szczecin
Geographic history of Czechoslovakia
Czechoslovakia–Poland relations